Yana's Friends is a 1999 Israeli film directed by Arik Kaplun. script editor: Savi Gabizon. Critically acclaimed, it won 10 Israeli Academy Awards including the Ophir Award for Best Picture. It also won the Crystal Globe at the 34th Karlovy Vary International Film Festival in 1999. The film has a very rare 100% rating on the film website Rotten Tomatoes based on 30 reviews, with an average rating of 7.16/10. The site's consensus reads: "A heartwarming movie that handles some weighty subjects with humor".

References

External links
 

1999 films
Israeli drama films
1990s Hebrew-language films
1990s Russian-language films
Crystal Globe winners
1999 drama films
Films set in Tel Aviv
1999 multilingual films
Israeli multilingual films